Cosmocampus heraldi is a species of marine fish of the family Syngnathidae. It is known from only seven specimens, which were found at the Desventuradas and Juan Fernandez Islands in Chile. It is expected to feed on small crustaceans like other pipefish. This species is ovoviviparous, with males carrying eggs until giving birth to live young.

Etymology
Described by Ronald Alan Fritzsche, the specific name honours the ichthyologist Earl Stannard Herald (1914-1973) who had a lifelong interest in pipefish.

References

Further reading

WoRMS

heraldi
Marine fish
Fish of the Pacific Ocean
Fish described in 1980